Via di Grottarossa is a road located north of Rome, Italy. It runs from the Grande Raccordo Anulare to the Via Flaminia. The road was part of the individual road race cycling event for the 1960 Summer Olympics.

References
1960 Summer Olympics official report. Volume 1. p. 84.
1960 Summer Olympics official report. Volume 2. Part 2. p. 319.

Venues of the 1960 Summer Olympics
Roads in Italy
Olympic cycling venues